MNM may refer to:

 Master of Nonprofit Management, a post-graduate degree
 Mapena language (mnm), ISO 639 language code
 Makkal Neethi Maiyam, a political party in Tamil Nadu
 Maternal near miss, a near-fatal event for a pregnant woman
 Menominee-Marinette Twin County Airport (MNM), FAA and IATA airport code
 Merchant Navy Medal for Meritorious Service
 MNM (professional wrestling), a wrestling stable
 Mutants & Masterminds (MnM), a role-playing game
 Radio MNM, a Flemish radio station

See also 
 M&M's, chocolate confectionery
 Eminem (born 1972), rap artist Marshall Mathers III
 M&M (disambiguation)